Giulio Panicali (February 17, 1899 – June 13, 1987) was an Italian actor and voice actor.

Biography
Panicali was born in Turin to Oscar Panicali and Lidia Gazzeri. His father was a Bersaglieri colonel. He started his acting career on screen in 1934, appearing in nine films in total within 21 years. He has even performed acting work for the EIAR public service broadcasting company.

Panicali was also a voice dubbing artist, dubbing foreign language films for release in Italy. He was considered to be among the greatest champions of dubbing during the Golden Ages and typically dubbed over the voices of actors such as Tyrone Power, Bing Crosby, Robert Taylor, Glenn Ford, Kirk Douglas, Ray Milland, Robert Mitchum, Ronald Reagan, Henry Fonda, Joel McCrea, Fred MacMurray, Montgomery Clift and many more. In Panicali's animated roles, he voiced the Prince in the Italian version of Snow White and the Seven Dwarfs.

As a dubbing director, Panicali oversaw the Italian dialogue for many foreign films, including several animated Disney films such as The Sword in the Stone, The Jungle Book and Lady and the Tramp.

Filmography

Cinema
Tenebre (1934)
L'eredità in corsa (1939)
Giù il sipario (1940)
A Woman Has Fallen (1941)
 The Woman of Sin (1942)
Labbra serrate (1942)
The Two Orphans (1942)
Bengasi (1942)
The Rose of Bagdad (1949) – Voice
Desperate Farewell (1955)

Dubbing roles

Animation
The Prince in Snow White and the Seven Dwarfs
Fourth narrator in The Three Caballeros

Live action
Barton Dewitt Clinton in Rose of Washington Square
Jonathan Blake in Lloyd's of London
Martin Maher in The Long Gray Line
Tim Baker in A Yank in the R.A.F.
Tom Owens in Rawhide
Ken Norton in Day-Time Wife
Stan Carlisle in Nightmare Alley
Thomas Jefferson Tyler in That Wonderful Urge
Walter of Gurnie in The Black Rose
Juan Gallardo in Blood and Sand
Jake Barnes in The Sun Also Rises
Duncan MacDonald in Pony Soldier
Jesse James in Jesse James
Andrea Orsini in Prince of Foxes
Jamie Waring in The Black Swan
Stephen Fitzgerald in The Luck of the Irish
Ward Stewart in Crash Dive
Mark Fallon in The Mississippi Gambler
Pedro de Vargas in Captain from Castile
Jonathan Kent in Brigham Young
Paul van Riebeck in Untamed
Mike Kells in Diplomatic Courier
Larry Darrell in The Razor's Edge
Peter Standish in I'll Never Forget You
Chuck Palmer in American Guerrilla in the Philippines
Eddy Duchin in The Eddy Duchin Story
Dion O'Leary in In Old Chicago
Alan King in King of the Khyber Rifles
Bing Crosby / Ray Milland in Star Spangled Rhythm
Bing Crosby in Let's Make Love
Bing Crosby in Alias Jesse James
Pete Garvey in Here Comes the Groom
Dan Brooks in Riding High
Harvey Howard in High Time
George Cochran in Road to Bali
Bill Benson in Anything Goes
Johnny Adams in Blue Skies
Jordan Blake in Just for You
Jim Hardy in Holiday Inn
Frank Elgin in The Country Girl
Chuck Reardon in Road to Zanzibar
Father Conroy in Say One for Me
Paul Merrick in Mr. Music
Josh Mallon V in Road to Singapore
Jeff Peters in Road to Morocco
Harry Turner in The Road to Hong Kong
Bill Wainwright in Little Boy Lost
Jim Pearson in Welcome Stranger
Bob Wallace in White Christmas
Duke Johnson / Junior Hooton in Road to Utopia
Scat Sweeney in Road to Rio
Joe Mulqueen in Top o' the Morning
Mark Brandon in Valley of the Kings
Charles Gilson in The Last Hunt
Billy the Kid in Billy the Kid
Steve Sinclair in Saddle the Wind
Johnny Eager in Johnny Eager
Christopher Kelvaney in Rogue Cop
Paul Tibbets in Above and Beyond
Roy Cronin in Waterloo Bridge
Lance Poole in Devil's Doorway
Brad Parker in D-Day the Sixth of June
Ward Kinsman in Ambush
Bushrod Gentry in Many Rivers to Cross
Joel Shore in All the Brothers Were Valiant
Cliff Barton in The Power and the Prize
Buck Wyatt in Westward the Women
Rigby in The Bribe
Lloyd Treadman in Tip on a Dead Jockey
Lancelot in Knights of the Round Table
Rio in Ride, Vaquero!
Quentin Durward in The Adventures of Quentin Durward
Michael Curragh in Conspirator
Wilfred of Ivanhoe in Ivanhoe
Armand Duval in Camille
Sam Dent in The Americano
Richard Dadier in Blackboard Jungle
Ben Wade in 3:10 to Yuma
Tom Reece in Cowboy
George Temple / George Kelby Jr. in The Fastest Gun Alive
Thomas King in Interrupted Melody
Dave Stannard in Ransom!
Mike Blake in The Green Glove
Maxwell Webster in Young Man with Ideas
Max Siegel in Don't Go Near the Water
David Blake in Trial
Colonel Dax in Paths of Glory
Spartacus in Spartacus
Ned Land in 20,000 Leagues Under the Sea
Einar in The Vikings
Tucker Wedge in The Walls of Jericho
Jack Burns in Lonely Are the Brave
Brendan O'Malley in The Last Sunset
Peter Niles in Mourning Becomes Electra
George Phipps in A Letter to Three Wives
George Brougham in The List of Adrian Messenger
Johnny Hawks in The Indian Fighter
Don Birnam in The Lost Weekend
John Geste in Beau Geste
George Stroud in The Big Clock
Mark Bellis in So Evil My Love
Alan Miller in Something to Live For
Steven Tolliver in Reap the Wild Wind
Stephen Neale in Ministry of Fear
Robert Lawson in Sealed Verdict
Wes Steele in A Man Alone
Roderick Fitzgerald in The Uninvited
Philip Kirby in The Major and the Minor
Patrick Fairlie in Jamaica Run
Jeff Bailey in Out of the Past
Dan Milner in His Kind of Woman
Nick Cochran in Macao
Jeff McCloud in The Lusty Men
Lucas Marsh in Not as a Stranger
Harry Powell in The Night of the Hunter
Felix Bowers in Fire Down Below
Charles Delacro in The Grass Is Greener
Lonni Douglas in White Witch Doctor
Mark Lucas in My Forbidden Past
Robert Sellers in She Couldn't Say No
Wilson in Bandido
Thomas McQuigg in The Racket
Lucas Doolin in Thunder Road
Dave Bishop in Foreign Intrigue
Hal Norton in Louisa
Vance Britton in The Last Outpost
Peter Boyd in Bedtime for Bonzo
Jeff Williams in Hong Kong
Frame Johnson in Law and Order
Dan McCloud in Tropic Zone
Juror No. 8 in 12 Angry Men
Theodore Roosevelt Jr. in The Longest Day
Frank Beardsley in Yours, Mine and Ours
Tommy Turner in The Male Animal
Peter Ames in The Mad Miss Manton
Eddie Taylor in You Only Live Once
Robert A. Leffingwell in Advise & Consent
Richard Glasgow in Come and Get It
John L. Sullivan in Sullivan's Travels
Ramsay McKay in Wells Fargo
The Virginian in The Virginian
Zack Hallock in The Lone Hand
Clete Mattson in Border River
Chuck Conner in Saddle Tramp
Walter Neff in Double Indemnity
Bill Morgan in Where Do We Go from Here?
Edward Rickenbacker in Captain Eddie
Bob MacDonald in The Egg and I
Matt Gordon in Singapore
Al in On Our Merry Way
Bill Dunnigan in The Miracle of the Bells
Grant Jordan in Family Honeymoon
Peter Ulysses Lockwood in A Millionaire for Christy
Meriwether Lewis in The Far Horizons
Clifford Groves in There's Always Tomorrow
Morris Townsend in The Heiress
George Eastman in A Place in the Sun
Michael William Logan in I Confess
Robert E. Lee Prewitt in From Here to Eternity
Giovanni Doria in Terminal Station
Danny MacCullough in The Big Lift

References

External links

1899 births
1987 deaths
Actors from Turin
Italian male voice actors
Italian male film actors
Italian male radio actors
Italian voice directors
20th-century Italian male actors